Narmadapuram Division  is  one of the administrative divisions in the Indian state of Madhya Pradesh.

The division was formally inaugurated on 27 August 2008. It comprises Narmadapuram, Harda, and Betul districts. The three districts were earlier part of Bhopal Division.

References

External links
 

Divisions of Madhya Pradesh